Col d'Izoard is a mountain pass in the Alps in the department of Hautes-Alpes in France.

It is accessible in summer via the D902 road, connecting Briançon on the north and the valley of the Guil in Queyras, which ends at Guillestre in the south. There are forbidding and barren scree slopes with protruding pinnacles of weathered rock on the upper south side. Known as the Casse Déserte, this area has formed a dramatic backdrop to some key moments in the Tour de France, and often featured in iconic 1950s black-and-white photos of the race.

Cycle racing

Details of the climb

Over this distance, the climb gains  at an average of 6.9% and a maximum sustained gradient of 10%.

On both sides mountain pass cycling milestones are placed every kilometre. They indicate the current height, the height of the summit, the distance to the summit, as well as the average slope in the following kilometre.

In general, the col is closed from October to early June.

Tour de France
The Col d'Izoard is frequently on the route of the Tour de France, where it is frequently classified as an Hors Categorie climb. Warren Barguil won the 2017 Tour de France's Stage 18, becoming the first cyclist to win a Tour de France stage that finished on the Col d'Izoard - it has been on the route 34 times previously in the Tour de France since 1922 but never before had a stage finished there.

Several of the Tour de France's more memorable moments have occurred on the Col d'Izoard, particularly the exploits of Fausto Coppi, Bernard Thévenet and Louison Bobet. A small cycling museum is at the summit, along with a memorial to Coppi and Bobet.

Appearances in the Tour de France

See also
 List of highest paved roads in Europe
 List of mountain passes
 Souvenir Henri Desgrange

References

External links 
Col d'Izoard on Google Maps (Tour de France classic climbs)
Cycling up to the Col d'Izoard: data, profile, map, photos and description

Mountain passes of Provence-Alpes-Côte d'Azur
Mountain passes of the Alps
Climbs in cycle racing in France
Landforms of Hautes-Alpes
Transport in Provence-Alpes-Côte d'Azur